Manamagale Vaa is a 1988 Indian Tamil-language romantic comedy film written and directed by Panchu Arunachalam, his directorial debut. The film stars Prabhu and Raadhika. It was released on 25 November 1988. The film was remade in Telugu as Idem Pellam Baboi (1990) and in Kannada as Halli Rambhe Belli Bombe (1991).

Plot 

Balu is an eligible bachelor, looking for a wife. With a picture perfect woman in mind, he insults and rejects many women. Meanwhile, Chitra is looking for a way to reconcile her sister Geetha's marriage with her husband. Geetha has been sent to her parents' home for no fault of hers. Chitra figures that the most appropriate way to settle scores with her sister's in-laws is by marrying Balu, as Geetha is married to Balu's brother. She disguises herself as a village belle, Rajathi and enters Balu's life. After marriage, Balu is traumatised by her ignorance, but Rajathi falls in love with him. Meanwhile, Rajathi's suitor from the village hatches a plan to bring her back from her husband and marry her forcibly. Balu, on the other hand, decides to divorce Rajathi. Chitra decides to unveil her mask now, but will her plan succeed or boomerang?

Cast 

Prabhu as Balu
Raadhika as Chitra and Rajathi
Goundamani as Gounder
Chinni Jayanth
P. R. Varalakshmi
V. K. Ramasamy
S. S. Chandran
Kanthimathi
Kovai Sarala as Ponni
Vennira Aadai Moorthy
Soorya as Geetha
Oru Viral Krishna Rao
Idichapuli Selvaraj
Charle
Omakuchi Narasimhan
Typist Gopu
Manorama
Sudha
 Mannangatti Subramaniam

Production 
Manamagale Vaa is the directorial debut of Panchu Arunachalam, and was initially titled Kothandarama Reddi.

Soundtrack 
The music was composed by Ilaiyaraaja, while the lyrics for the songs were written by Panchu Arunachalam, except the song "Tell Me", which was written by Vaali.

Reception 
The Indian Express appreciated the film for reversing the "Taming of the shrew" formula. P. S. S. of Kalki appreciated the film for its comedy.

References

External links 
 

1980s Tamil-language films
1988 directorial debut films
1988 romantic comedy films
1988 films
Films directed by Panchu Arunachalam
Films scored by Ilaiyaraaja
Films with screenplays by Panchu Arunachalam
Indian romantic comedy films
Tamil films remade in other languages